Schack August Steenberg Krogh  (15 November 1874 – 13 September 1949) was a Danish professor at the department of zoophysiology at the University of Copenhagen from 1916 to 1945. He contributed a number of fundamental discoveries within several fields of physiology, and is famous for developing the Krogh Principle.

In 1920 August Krogh was awarded the Nobel Prize in Physiology or Medicine for the discovery of the mechanism of regulation of the capillaries in skeletal muscle. Krogh was first to describe the adaptation of blood perfusion in muscle and other organs according to demands through opening and closing the arterioles and capillaries.

Besides his contributions to medicine, Krogh was also one of the founders of what is today the Novo Nordisk company.

Life
He was born in Grenaa on the peninsula of Djursland in Denmark, the son of Viggo Krogh, a shipbuilder. He was educated at the Aarhus Katedralskole in Aarhus. He attended the University of Copenhagen graduating MSc in 1899 and gaining a doctorate PhD in 1903.

Krogh was a pioneer in comparative physiology. He wrote his thesis on the respiration through the skin and lungs in frogs: Respiratory Exchange of Animals, 1915. Later Krogh took on studies of water and electrolyte homeostasis of aquatic animals and he published the books: Osmotic Regulation (1939) and Comparative Physiology of Respiratory Mechanisms (1941). He contributed more than 200 research articles in international journals. He was a constructor of scientific instruments of which several had considerable practical importance, such as the spirometer and the apparatus for measuring basal metabolic rate.

Krogh began lecturing in the University of Copenhagen in 1908 and in 1916 was promoted to full professor, becoming the head of the first laboratory for animal physiology (zoophysiology) at the university.

Krogh and his wife Marie brought insulin to Denmark shortly after its discovery in 1922 by Frederick Banting and Charles Best. Marie, a doctor who had patients with type 1 diabetes, was herself suffering from type 2 diabetes and was naturally very interested in the disease. Together with doctor Hans Christian Hagedorn, August and Marie Krogh founded Nordisk Insulinlaboratorium, where Krogh made decisive contributions to establishing a Danish production of insulin by ethanol extraction of the hormone from the pancreatic glands of pigs.

In the 1930s, Krogh worked with two other Nobel prizewinners, the radiochemist George de Hevesy and the physicist Niels Bohr on the permeability of membranes to heavy water and radioactive isotopes, and together, they managed to obtain Denmark's first cyclotron for experiments on animal and plant physiology as well as in dental and medical work.

Publications
The Respiratory Exchange of Animals and Man (1916)
Osmotic Regulation in Aquatic Animals (1939)
The Comparative Physiology of Respiratory Mechanisms (1941)

Family
He married Marie Krogh (née Jørgensen, 1874–1943) in 1905. She was a renowned scientist in her own right and much of August Krogh's work was carried out in close collaboration with her.

August and Marie had four children, the youngest of whom, Bodil, was born in 1918. She too was a physiologist, and became the first woman president of the American Physiological Society in 1975. Bodil married another eminent physiologist, Knut Schmidt-Nielsen.

Legacy
Torkel Weis-Fogh, an eminent pioneer on the study of insect flight, was a student of August Krogh's. Together they wrote a classic paper on that subject in 1951.

Krogh's name is preserved in two items now named for him: 
 Krogh length, the distance between capillaries which nutrients diffuse to, based on cellular consumption of the nutrients.
 Krogh's principle, that "for... a large number of problems there will be some animal of choice, or a few such animals, on which it can be most conveniently studied."

Further reading

References

External links 

  including the Nobel Lecture on December 11, 1920 A Contribution to the Physiology of the Capillaries

1874 births
1949 deaths
Nobel laureates in Physiology or Medicine
Danish Nobel laureates
Danish physiologists
Foreign Members of the Royal Society
Foreign associates of the National Academy of Sciences
People from Norddjurs Municipality